Kolkach is a rural locality (a village) in Yargomzhskoye Rural Settlement, Cherepovetsky District, Vologda Oblast, Russia. The population was 11 as of 2002.

Geography 
Markhinino is the nearest rural locality.

References 

Rural localities in Cherepovetsky District